Morato may refer to:

 Morato or Morató, surname of various origins
 Francisco Morato, city in São Paulo State, Brazil
 Tomas Morato Avenue, Quezon City, Philippines
 Uru-Murato, Bolivian indigenous
 Antony Morato, Italian menswear brand
 Morató, Uruguay, town in Paysandú Department